Al-Qubab was a Palestinian Arab village in the Ramle Subdistrict. It was depopulated in July 1948 during the Operation Dani led by the Yiftach Brigade.

History
Remains, possibly dating from the Roman era have been found here. Archeological excavations have revealed tombs and cisterns dating to the Roman and Byzantine eras, and addition to pottery remains from the same eras.

Pottery remains from the early Islamic era, including a glazed bowl from the Abbasid period have also been found here.

Mamluk era
During the late Mamluk era, Mujir al-Din wrote that al-Qubab was a village within the administrative jurisdiction of al-Ramla in 1483.  Mujir al-Din further noted that In 898 A. H., or 1492 C.E. the fellahin rebelled against the governor of Jerusalem. They were then caught between the governors of Gaza and Jerusalem, about in whose jurisdiction Al-Qubab was.

Ceramics from the Mamluk era have also been excavated here.

Ottoman era
In 1838, it was noted as a Muslim  village, Beit Kubab,  in the Ibn Humar area in the District of Er-Ramleh.

Edward Robinson passed by the village in 1852 and described it as being of considerable size.

In 1863, Victor Guérin found it to have at least five hundred inhabitants, while an Ottoman   village list from about 1870 found that Al-Qubab had a population of 381, in 114 houses, though the population count included men, only.

In 1883, the PEF's Survey of Western Palestine (SWP)  described it as "a small adobe village on rising ground, by the main road. It is surrounded with prickly-pear hedges and olives. The ground is rocky. The water-supply is from the fine spring of 'Ain Yerdeh. This spring is 1 1/4 miles from the village, yet is the only source whence water is obtained."

British Mandate era
In the 1922 census of Palestine, conducted by the British Mandate authorities, Qubab  had a population of 1,275 inhabitants, all Muslims,  increasing in the 1931 census to 1502 inhabitants, all Muslim, in 382 houses.

It had a population of 1,980 Muslims in the  1945 statistics,   while the total land area was 13,918 dunams, according to an official land and population survey. Of this, a total of 12,295 dunums were allocated to cereals,  238 dunums were irrigated or used for plantations, while 54 dunams were classified as built-up urban areas.

1948, aftermath

On September 13, 1948, al-Qubab was mostly destroyed, although the school (founded in 1921) and few houses remain standing.

In 1992 the village site was so described: "The part of the north side of the kibbutz is covered by woods. The only landmark that remains is the school; a number of stone houses that have rectangular doors and windows still stand, and some of them are used as Israeli residences. One is rectangular and has two doors, one high window and two very small windows, one on the side and another in the front. Another residential house is angular; there is a tall tree in the yard in front of it. One of the houses used for storing agricultural tools and equipment is rectangular, with four front entrances and a high window. Another house, used at present as a shop, has a stairway leading to a front porch that is enclosed by wire grillwork. A variety of trees and other types of vegetation grow on the site, including eucalyptus and carob trees, cactuses, and foxtail. The surrounding land is planted with almond and olive trees."

On the ruins of the destroyed Palestinian village, in 2005 a monument to the Lechi fighters (the Stern Gang) has been erected.

References

Bibliography

 

  

  
  
 

 (pp.  257,  346,  354,  376, 395)
 
 

   (p. 31, quoted in Guérin, 1868, p. 57)

External links
Welcome To al-Qubab
al-Qubab, Zochrot
Survey of Western Palestine, Map 17: IAA, Wikimedia commons
al-Qubab from the Khalil Sakakini Cultural Center

Arab villages depopulated during the 1948 Arab–Israeli War
District of Ramla